The Onderlinge van 1719 u.a. is a life insurance firm on the Korte Begijnestraat 14 in Haarlem, Netherlands. It is the oldest still independent life insurance firm in the Netherlands.

History

The fund was founded on February 12, 1719 as a "begrafenisbos" or funeral insurance firm. The old name was "Begrafenisbos De Vrijwillige Liefdebeurs", with the motto "In Alles Ghetrou" (faithful in everything). This is the name that is on the facade of the building, which was designed in 1870-1871 by the Haarlem architect Adrianus van der Steur (1836-1899). The company was first located at the neighboring building, Korte Begijnestraat 16. After an argument with the neighbour, a baker whose oven "made the meetings of the society overheated", the company decided to solve the mutual problem between the neighbour and the fund by buying the neighbour's house. That house was bought and then renovated to create the current building. The building is currently located between the Toneelschuur and the Hofje van Bakenes. On occasion of the 300th anniversary of the firm, the Haarlem Opera staged an opera, named De Liefdesbeurs, dedicated to the firm.

Fund and building today
The board of the fund consists of 10 to 15 citizens of Haarlem. They are volunteers. The office of the fund is open every Friday evening from 19:00 to 22:00. Originally the board would meet on Sunday afternoon, after going to church, but in 1935 Friday evening was chosen. The fund still serves as a full-fledged funeral insurance firm; policies are still being sold and the company is in very good financial shape. For the fact that the building is a good example of the oeuvre of A. van der Steur, as well as the fact that it still operates under the same charter for which it was formed, both numbers 14 and 16 have rijksmonument status.

References

External links
 Fund Web site

Rijksmonuments in Haarlem
Insurance companies of the Netherlands
Financial services companies established in 1719
History of Haarlem
1719 establishments in the Dutch Republic
18th-century architecture in the Netherlands